Jacques Décombe is a French author, actor and director born in 1953.

Biography 
After he studied at the Conservatoire national d'art dramatique, he was the director of the shows of Les Inconnus at the request of Didier Bourdon and won the Molière Award for best comedy show. (See :fr:Molière du meilleur spectacle comique) in 1991. He also directed shows by Charlotte de Turckheim, Patrick Timsit, Les Chevaliers du fiel...

References

External links 
 Jacques Décombe on BnF
 
 Jacques Décombe on Allociné

1953 births
Living people
Place of birth missing (living people)
French theatre directors
French male stage actors
French male writers
20th-century French male actors
21st-century French male actors